Vasasällskapet FK is a Swedish football club located in Stockholm.

Background
Vasasällskapet FK currently plays in Division 4 Stockholm Mellersta which is the sixth tier of Swedish football. They play their home matches at the Stadshagens IP in Stockholm.

The club is affiliated to Stockholms Fotbollförbund.

Season to season

Footnotes

External links
 Vasasällskapet FK – Official website
 Vasasällskapet FK on Facebook

Football clubs in Stockholm